The Women's singles event at the 2022 Mediterranean Games will be held from 27 June to 1 July at the Habib Khelil Tennis Complex.

Guiomar Maristany of Spain won the gold medal, defeating Nuria Brancaccio of Italy in the final, 6–2, 5–7, 6–2.

Jéssica Bouzas Maneiro of Spain won the bronze medal, defeating Chiraz Bechri of Tunisia in the bronze medal match, Walkover.

Medalists

Seeds

Draw

Finals

Top half

Bottom half

References

External links
 Women's singles Draw

Women's singles
2022 in women's tennis